Craig Rice may refer to:

 Craig Rice (author) (1908–1957), pseudonym of Georgiana Ann Randolph Walker Craig, American author of mystery novels and short stories
 Craig L. Rice (born 1972), American politician
Craig Rice (music producer) from Paisley Park Records

See also